Güney Dal (born 1944, in Çanakkale) is a Turkish-German writer. He has worked as journalist for the radio and television service Sender Freies Berlin.

Family
His children, who are named Ceren Dal (born 1973) and Sophie Dal (born 1981), are both actors.

Awards 
 1976 Romanpreis des Verlages Milliyat (Istanbul)
 1980 Literaturstipendium des Berliner Senats
 1983 Literaturstipendium des Berliner Senats
 1985 Literaturstipendium des Berliner Senats
 1997 Adelbert-von-Chamisso-Preis

References

External links
 

1944 births
Living people

Turkish male writers
Turkish emigrants to Germany
German male writers